Atopospora is a genus of fungi in the family Venturiaceae. This is a monotypic genus, containing the single species Atopospora betulina.

References

External links
Atopospora at Index Fungorum

Venturiaceae
Monotypic Dothideomycetes genera